Enrico Fazzini, D.O., Ph.D. is a neurologist. He is considered an expert on Parkinson's disease and has published numerous research publications on the subject. He has been involved in a number of clinical trials for new pharmaceutical treatments for Parkinson's disease. He attended the University of Osteopathic Medicine and Health Sciences in Des Moines, Iowa.  He is board certified in neurology by both the M.D. and D.O. medical boards. He began his practice in 1989. Dr. Enrico Fazzini completed his neurology training at Boston University in 1987 and his fellowship in Movement Disorders at Columbia Presbyterian in 1989. In addition to being a neurologist, Dr. Fazzini has a Ph.D. in Behavioral Neuroscience from Boston University and is an expert on the diagnosis and treatment of patients with traumatic brain injuries.

Publications
Dr. Fazzini's publications are listed on PubMed.
Dr. Fazzini is credited with reintroducing surgical therapies utilized in the treatment of Parkinson's disease.

References

External links
 The Parkinson's Doctor

Living people
American osteopathic physicians
American people of Italian descent
American neurologists
Boston University alumni
Des Moines University alumni
Year of birth missing (living people)